Richard Jefferson (born 1980) is an American sports analyst and former basketball player.

Richard Jefferson may also refer to:

Richard Jefferson (cricketer) (born 1941), English cricketer
Richard Anthony Jefferson (born 1956), American molecular biologist
Richard H. Jefferson (1931–2021), American politician in the Minnesota House of Representatives